Deportivo Bancos is a Peruvian football club, playing in the city of Pucallpa, Peru.

Rivalries
Deportivo Bancos has had a long-standing rivalry with local club Deportivo Pucallpa.

Honours

Regional
Liga Departamental de Ucayali:
Winners (1): 1988
Runner-up (2): 2009, 2013

Liga Provincial de Coronel Portillo:
Winners (3): 1967, 2009, 2013
Runner-up (1): 1955

Liga Distrital de Callería:
Winners (3): 2009, 2013, 2017
Runner-up (1): 2022

See also
List of football clubs in Peru
Peruvian football league system

External links
Los 15 sobrevivientes
Perú 1991
Perú 1992

Football clubs in Peru